The Overture & the Underscore is the 2004 (see 2004 in music) debut album by Australian singer-songwriter Sarah Blasko.

Background 

"Essentially I wanted there to be something really classic about the album", says Blasko on her official website. "The kind of debut albums I like are those that don't try and do too much too soon, that point towards a number of possible directions, and that give the songs some room to move. It was really important to me that my voice and the songs had some character and that there was an intimacy to them. We tried to achieve this by using little or no effect on the voice and not going too far with overdubs."

Triple J music director Richard Kingsmill rated it ninth on his list of favourite 2004 albums. In 2011, he named it the 10th Greatest Australian Album Of All Time.

The album features former Beck and R.E.M. drummer Joey Waronker, who took a few days off working on Paul McCartney's album Chaos and Creation in the Backyard with producer Nigel Godrich to lay down his drum tracks for The Overture & the Underscore.

Reception 

The album peaked at Number 35 on the ARIA Albums Chart.

Track list

"All Coming Back" – 3:15
"Beautiful Secrets" – 3:24
"Always Worth It" – 3:46
"At Your Best" – 3:36
"Don't U Eva" – 4:19
"Counting Sheep" – 4:21
"Perfect Now" – 3:33
"Sweet November" – 3:55
"Cinders" – 4:09
"True Intentions" – 4:11
"Remorse" – 15:38 [The song "Remorse" ends at 5:31. After 5 minutes of silence (5:31 - 10:31), begins the hidden track "Long Time".]

All songs written by Sarah Blasko and Robert F Cranny.

Singles

"Don't U Eva" was released as a CD single containing two unique B-sides ("Fall Down" and "Into the Great Wide Open") on September 27, 2004.

The following tracks have been released as radio singles:

 "Counting Sheep"
 "Perfect Now"
 "Always Worth It"

Charts

Studio crew

 Joey Waronker - Drums and percussion
 Robert F Cranny - Bass, drum programming, horn & string sample arrangements, guitars, organ, piano, synth
 Sarah Blasko - Vocals, guitars, synth, percussion
Other musical contributors included Wally Gagel, Nadav & Edo Khan, Darren Hanlon, Bruce MacFarlane and Korel Tunador.
All tracks recorded & mixed by Wally Gagel, and mastered by Louis Teran, except "Long Time", recorded by Bruce MacFarlane.

References

External links
Sarah Blasko official site
Sarah Blasko fan site
Sarah Blasko Forum
Dew Process Records (Australia)
Low Altitude Records (United States)

2004 debut albums
Sarah Blasko albums